The Great Western Railway Caesar Class  broad gauge steam locomotives. They were designed by Daniel Gooch for goods train work. This class was introduced into service between June 1851 and February 1852, and withdrawn between June 1871 and June 1880.

From about 1865, the Caesar Class was expanded to include locomotives formerly known as Ariadne Class, Caliph Class, or GWR Pyracmon Class.

Names
.

References

 
 

Caesar
0-6-0ST locomotives
Broad gauge (7 feet) railway locomotives
Railway locomotives introduced in 1851